George James Kenagy (born 1945, in Los Angeles, California) is known for his research in ecophysiology and behavior of small mammals.

Education

Jim Kenagy graduated from Crescenta Valley High School in 1963, and he graduated with a degree in Zoology in 1967 at Pomona College in Claremont, California. Then he achieved his Ph.D. in Zoology from the University of California in Los Angeles in 1972. He held postdocs in Germany (at the Max Planck Institute for Behavioral Physiology), at UCLA, and at UC San Diego.  In 1976, he joined the Department of Zoology at the University of Washington in Seattle, which became the Department of Biology in 2002.  In 1995, he also became Curator of Mammals at the Burke Museum of Natural History and Culture.[5]

Career

As a postdoc at Max Planck, Kenagy investigated daily rhythms and seasonal reproductive patterns in desert rodents. Kenagy has conducted research in Australia, South America, and the University of California-Berkeley's Museum of Vertebrate Zoology.  His research has encompassed ecophysiology and behavior, and more recently has included population biology, biogeography, and evolution of mammals.  His occupation revolves around the continual research of biogeography and evolution of mammalian populations, and training graduate students at the University of Washington and associate with the Burke Museum.[5]

Present

As the curator of the Burke Museum in Seattle, Washington, Kenagy oversaw the research of graduate students including projects in:
Biogeography of Pacific Northwest Mammals
Tracking the History of Northwest Mouse Populations with their Genetic Signatures
Local vs. Widespread Population Structure of Jumping Mice on the Olympic Peninsula
Desert Ground Squirrel Adaptation from Mexico to Oregon
Tracking a Rare Marsupial in Chile's Southern Rain Forest
Mammals of Sichuan Province, China

Titles of selected publications

Historical demography and genetic structure of sister species: deermice (Peromyscus) in the North American temperate rain forest
Genetic structure of desert ground squirrels over a 20-degree-latitude transect from Oregon through the Baja California peninsula
Conservation genetics of endangered flying squirrels (Glaucomys) from the Appalachian mountains of eastern North America
Historical biogeography and post-glacial recolonization of South American temperate rain forest by the relictual marsupial Dromiciops gliroides
Nuclear and mitochondrial DNA reveal contrasting evolutionary processes in populations of deer mice (Peromyscus maniculatus)
Influence of montane isolation and refugia on population structure of Sorex palustris in western North America
Biogeography and Population Genetics of Peromyscus maniculatus in the American West
Detecting Natural Selection in Pacific Northwest Deer Mice: An Integrative Approach
Journal of Mammalogy: Meanderings in the Bush. Natural History Explorations in Outback Australia.

References

[1](2011). Burke Museum of Natural History and Culture, retrieved October 2011 from http://www.burkemuseum.org/.

[2]Kenagy, Jim.  (2010). Meanderings in the Bush. Natural History Explorations in Outback Australia.  Journal of Mammalogy 91: 1528-1529. 

[3]Kenagy, Jim; Yang, Dou-Shuan.  (2006). Biogeography and Population Genetics of Peromyscus maniculatus in the American West.  Peromyscus Newsletter 41: 20 

[4]Kenagy, Jim; Yang, Dou-Shuan.  (2009). Detecting Natural Selection in Pacific Northwest Deer Mice: An Integrative Approach.  Peromyscus Newsletter 44: 29.  

[5](2010–2011).  University of Washington: Department of Biology. Retrieved October, 2011 from https://www.biology.washington.edu/people/profile/jim-kenagy.

1945 births
Living people
Scientists from California
American mammalogists
People from Corvallis, Oregon
Pomona College alumni
University of California, Los Angeles alumni
University of Washington faculty